Presidential elections were held in Slovenia on 6 December 1992. The result was a victory for incumbent Milan Kučan, who won 63.93% of the vote. Voter turnout was 85.78%.

Results

References

Slovenia
1992 in Slovenia
Presidential elections in Slovenia
December 1992 events in Europe